Action on Armed Violence (AOAV) is a London-based charity, conducting research and advocacy on the incidence and impact of global armed violence.

Iain Overton, an investigative journalist and author, is the Executive Director of the organisation.

AOAV's research and advocacy work is focused on global armed violence, with a specialisation in explosive weapons. One of the charity's core functions is its Explosive Violence Monitor. This monitor has been cited by organisations such as Reuters, The Guardian, Al Jazeera, Human Rights Watch, and the United Nations.

Conflict casualty data
In December 2020, AOAV's data was reported in The Guardian as showing that British soldiers were 12% more likely to have been killed than their American counterparts during the war on terror in Iraq and Afghanistan, according to a study of casualty figures. The research – intended as a lessons learned exercise – also concluded that UK forces were 26% more likely to have been killed by improvised explosives, validating longstanding complaints about the poorly armoured Snatch Land Rover.

In May 2021, AOAV's explosive violence data was also reported in The Guardian as showing that "Civilians accounted for 91% of those killed or injured by explosive weapons in populated areas worldwide over the last 10 years – a total of 238,892 people – according to a study of thousands of incidents."

Recording civilian harm
In March 2019, AOAV was reported by the BBC as finding out that the RAF killed or injured 4,315 enemy fighters in Iraq and Syria between September 2014 and January 2019. The UK's Ministry of Defence had said only one civilian was killed in the airstrikes, according to figures released to the charity. Of those harmed, 4,013, or 93%, were killed, and 302, or 7%, were injured. Yet the MoD says only one civilian was killed in the airstrikes, raising concerns about how many civilians killed the MOD in the UK records.

In April 2021, AOAV was reported by The Independent as finding out that Black people are three times more likely to be killed on the streets of London than other ethnic groups. Almost half of all murder victims in the capital in 2019 were Black despite them making up only 13 per cent of the city’s population.

In May 2021, AOAV was reported by Al Jazeera as finding out that between 2016 and 2020, 40 percent of all civilian air strike casualties in Afghanistan were children. AOAV had reported that, of the 3,977 casualties caused over five years, 1,598 were children killed or wounded in attacks from the air. Civilian casualties resulting from air strikes by the Afghan Air Force during the first six months of 2020 had tripled compared to the same time period in 2019.

Monitoring the arms trade
In August 2016, The New York Times cited AOAV's research into 14 years’ worth of Pentagon contract information related to weapons supplied to American troops and for their partners and proxies. AOAV found the Pentagon provided more than 1.45 million firearms to various security forces in Afghanistan and Iraq, including more than 978,000 assault rifles, 266,000 pistols and almost 112,000 machine guns.

In January 2021, The Guardian cited AOAV's research on the UK government's approval of exports between January 2015 and June 2020 to countries listed by the Department for International Trade as 'subject to arms embargo, trade sanctions and other trade restrictions'. AOAV found that Britain had approved exports of military items to 80% of the destinations on the list. AOAV also found that UK export licences for small arms and ammunition have been approved to 31 destinations on the embargoed and restricted list, including assault rifles, pistols, sniper rifles and shotguns. Many of these sent to areas that have recently suffered from violent conflicts or state oppression, including Kenya, Hong Kong, Lebanon, Kyrgyzstan, Togo, Oman, Azerbaijan, Armenia and Pakistan.

References

Charities based in the United Kingdom